Lieutenant general Sir Charles Edward Nairne  (30 June 1836 – 19 February 1899) was a British military officer who served in British India.

Early life
He was the son of Captain Alexander Nairne, a military officer in the East India Company.

Educated at Addiscombe Military Seminary, Nairne was commissioned into the Bengal Artillery in 1855. Due to sickness he was only present for two and a half terms at Addiscombe, instead of the usual four, and this prevented him joining the Bengal Engineers.

Career
During the Indian Mutiny in 1857 he was stationed mostly at Peshawar and only saw action towards its close. In 1863 he served in an expedition against the Yusufzai on the north-western frontier. He went on to serve as a Horse Battery Commander with the Peshawar Valley Field Force during the Second Afghan War from 1878 to 1880.

In 1882 he took part in the Anglo-Egyptian War and commanded the horse artillery at the Battle of Kassassin Lock and the Battle of Tel el-Kebir where he was mentioned in despatches. He was also appointed a Companion of the Order of the Bath (CB). In 1882 he became colonel of the depot staff of the horse artillery, and in 1885 commandant of the school of gunnery at Shoeburyness for the next two years. In 1887 he became Inspector-General of Artillery in India, serving in the role for five years. In 1890 he attained the rank of Major-general after 35 years service.

In 1892 Nairne was appointed to the command of the Division at Meerut, and the following year he became Commander-in-Chief of the Bombay Army (renamed Bombay Command in 1895). He was promoted Lieutenant-General in November 1895 and became a Knight Commander of the Order of the Bath (KCB) in June 1898. He was acting Commander-in-Chief, India from March to November 1898.

Death
He died suddenly on 19 February 1899 and was buried with military honours at Charlton Cemetery in London on 22 February.

Family
In 1860 he married Sophie Addison. His sister, Helen Catherine Nairne, who was born on 1 September 1843, married Sir Frederick Arnold-Baker.

References

Sources

 

|-

1836 births
1899 deaths
Knights Commander of the Order of the Bath
Recipients of the Order of the Medjidie, 3rd class
British Commanders-in-Chief of India
British military personnel of the Indian Rebellion of 1857
British Army generals
British military personnel of the Second Anglo-Afghan War
British Army personnel of the Anglo-Egyptian War
Bengal Artillery officers
Royal Artillery officers
British people in colonial India
Members of the Council of the Governor General of India